Clavus paroeca is a species of sea snail, a marine gastropod mollusk in the family Drilliidae.

Description
The length of the shell attains 19 mm, its diameter 7 mm.

(Original description) The solid shell has an abbreviately fusiform shape. It is white, the basal third of the body whorl is ochreous. It contains 9 whorls, including the smooth and globular protoconch. The remainder are longitudinally many-ribbed., These ribs are stout, angled, and echinate, crossed by many faint revolving lines. The body whorl is ten-ribbed. The aperture is oblong. The outer lip is slightly expanded. The columellar margin is almost straight. The wide siphonal canal is abbreviate. The sinus is well expressed, wide, and fairly deep.

Distribution
This species occurs in the demersal zone of the tropical Indo-Pacific; also off Brunei.

References

 Tucker, J.K. 2004 Catalog of recent and fossil turrids (Mollusca: Gastropoda). Zootaxa 682:1–1295

paroeca
Gastropods described in 1923